Bergsvåg is a Norwegian surname. Notable people with the surname include:

Arne Bergsvåg (born 1958), Norwegian politician
Henning H. Bergsvåg (born 1974), Norwegian poet and librarian

Norwegian-language surnames